Sushila Chaudhary is a member of 2nd Nepalese Constituent Assembly. She won Dang–2 seat in 2013 Nepalese Constituent Assembly election from Nepali Congress.

References

Year of birth missing (living people)
Living people
Nepali Congress politicians from Lumbini Province
21st-century Nepalese women politicians
21st-century Nepalese politicians
Members of the 2nd Nepalese Constituent Assembly